Denizen may refer to:

 An inhabitant of a place
 Denizen (film), a 2010 feature film directed, written and produced by J.A. Steel
 Denizen (video game), a computer game published by Players Software in 1988
 Denizen, a brand of the clothing company Levi Strauss & Co.
 Denization, an obsolete common-law process by which a foreigner gained some rights of a British subject